The 2023 SuperMotocross World Championship is the inaugural edition of the premier combined discipline off-road motorcycle racing competition, held in the United States. Combining the AMA Supercross Championship and the AMA Motocross Championship, along with three final SuperMotocross rounds, the total length of the series will run from January to October.

2023 AMA Supercross Championship 

The 2023 AMA Supercross Championship is the 50th season of off-road stadium motorcycle racing in the United States. Comprising 17 rounds, the series will run from January until May, crowning supercross champions in both the 250cc and 450cc classes, concluding with the Salt Lake City round on May 13.

2023 AMA Motocross Championship 

The 2023 AMA Motocross Championship is the 52nd season of the premier off-road motocross racing series in the United States. Comprising eleven rounds across three months from late May until August, the series will crown champions in both 250cc and 450cc classes.

2023 SuperMotocross World Championship 
The 2023 SuperMotocross World Championship is the inaugural season of the premier worldwide off-road motorcycle racing series, to be held in the United States. Combining the results of the 17 AMA Supercross Championship rounds and 11 AMA Motocross Championship events, the series will comprise 31 rounds in total, with three dedicated SuperMotocross rounds to determine the overall champion of AMA off-road motocycle racing for the season.

Television Coverage

See Also 

 AMA Supercross Championship
 AMA Motocross Championship
 2023 FIM Supercross World Championship
 2023 FIM Motocross World Championship

References 

AMA Motocross Championship
Motocross
Motorcycle off-road racing series
AMA Supercross Championship
Supercross
Feld Entertainment
Motorsport competitions in the United States
Motorsport competitions in Canada
SuperMotocross
SuperMotocross